Jim McArthur (13 July 1870 – 6 February 1937) was an Australian rules footballer who played with South Melbourne in the Victorian Football League (VFL).

Notes

External links 

1870 births
1937 deaths
Australian rules footballers from Victoria (Australia)
Sydney Swans players